Keith Kalyegira is an accountant, administrator and civil servant in Uganda. He is the chief executive officer of the Capital Markets Authority of Uganda. He was appointed to that position in November 2013, replacing Japheth Katto.

Background and education
He was born in Uganda circa 1971. He graduated from Makerere University in 1993 with a Bachelor of Commerce degree. His Master of Business Administration was obtained from the University of Cape Town in 2002. He is a member of the Institute of Chartered Secretaries and Administrators, a qualification that he obtained in 1997.

Career
He formerly served as a member of the governing council of the Uganda Securities Exchange. He also has served as the head of the Parastatal Monitoring Unit and Privatisation Utility Sector Reform Project under the Ministry of Finance. Before that, he served as an investment officer at the National Social Security Fund (Uganda). Before that, he served with Shell in their commercial aviation division in their southern and eastern Africa markets.

References

External links
CMA Uganda appoints new chief executive officer

Ugandan civil servants
Living people
Date of birth missing (living people)
People from Western Region, Uganda
Makerere University alumni
University of Cape Town alumni
1971 births